Ludwik Mycielski (13 April 1854, Warsaw – 6 January 1926) was a Polish politician, president of the National Council (Rada Narodowa) in 1913.

References 
 Witold Jakóbczyk, Przetrwać na Wartą 1815-1914, Dzieje narodu i państwa polskiego, vol. III-55, Krajowa Agencja Wydawnicza, Warszawa 1989

1854 births
1926 deaths
Politicians from Warsaw
People from Warsaw Governorate
Ludwik
Members of the 6th Reichstag of the German Empire
Members of the 7th Reichstag of the German Empire
Polish deputies to the Reichstag in Berlin